Robert Henry Neelands (July 8, 1881 – July 24, 1974) was a Canadian politician. He served in the Legislative Assembly of British Columbia from 1920 to 1928  from the electoral district of South Vancouver, as a member of the Canadian Labour Party.

References

Canadian Labour Party politicians
1881 births
1974 deaths
Members of the Legislative Assembly of British Columbia
20th-century Canadian politicians
People from Grey County